Polyscias gymnocarpa, commonly known as the Koolau Range 'ohe or Koolau tetraplasandra, is a species of flowering plant in the family Araliaceae, that is endemic to the Hawaiian island of Oahu.  It is threatened by habitat loss.

References

External links

gymnocarpa
Endemic flora of Hawaii
Trees of Hawaii
Critically endangered flora of the United States
Taxonomy articles created by Polbot